Dhobley may refer to:

 Dhobley (Gedo Region), in the Baardheere District of Somalia
 Dhobley (Lower Juba Region), in the Afmadow District of Somalia